Same Bed, Different Dreams (Hangul:동상이몽, 괜찮아 괜찮아) is a South Korean television entertainment program distributed and syndicated by SBS every Monday at 11:10 pm. Before February 15, 2016, the program aired every Saturday at 8:45 pm.

In the program, teens and their parents come and openly share their issues with the show's panel, trying to resolve their problems with each other.

Main MC
Yoo Jae-suk 
Kim Gura 
Seo Jang-hoon

Fixed and semi-fixed panelists
Jung Si Ah (from episode 56-62)
Yang Se-hyung (from episode 50-62)

Former panelist
Heo Ji-woong (episodes 8-23)
Choi Eun-kyeong (from episode 23-49) → except episodes 43,44,46,47,48
Kim Jun-hyun (from episode 28-44) → except episodes 42,43
Lee Soo-min (from episode 42-50) → except episodes 43,45,47,48

List of panelists

Controversy

During episode 14, a girl in high school came out to complain that her father seeks skinship with her despite her age. On the program she explained that her father not only tries to hold her hands but also touch her buttocks, thighs, and even tries to give her pecks.
The mood was not serious as the daughter explained it in a bright manner but wanted him to stop. The father also responded that he does so because he feels that she will not be his baby daughter anymore if he suddenly stops it. But during the show, the father is also seen grabbing her from behind as well as climbing onto her bed.

After the show aired, many disturbed viewers in Korea brought up the issue by bad mouthing the father for his inappropriate behavior to his grown daughter. Even an international viewer shared this on the online community Reddit and asked for the issue to be shared. Many have expressed that although they do not believe the father to be a pedophile, he needs to change his ways of treating his daughter.
Since then, the daughter featured on the program tried to explain the situation by stating that her father even claimed that there were too many skin-ship scenes as a lot of those parts were made up for the program. She also added that her family is indeed happy and to stop the hatred towards her father. After her message through her SNS account, many viewers have turned their hate towards the producers of the program by trying to make up scenes on the show to attract more viewers.

The producers and staff of Same Bed Different Dreams have officially apologized stating that many of the scenes were indeed put in to make things more interesting. And that they did not have intentions of disturbing viewers or making the family look bad. They also have promised to work more efficiently in order to bring better issues and episodes after this controversy.

Season 2

This season comes with a format change. Compared to season 1 where the purpose was to break down the barriers between generations and remediate the conflicts between parents and children this season focuses on the life of celebrity couples.

Ratings

2015

2016

Awards and nominations

References

2015 South Korean television series debuts
2016 South Korean television series endings
Korean-language television shows
Seoul Broadcasting System original programming
South Korean variety television shows
Television series by SM C&C